The dorsal intercarpal ligament consists of a series of fibrous bands that extend transversely across the dorsal surfaces of the carpal bones, connecting them to each other.

Hand
Ligaments